Safed Jhooth is a 1977 Bollywood comedy drama film, starring Ashok Kumar, Vinod Mehra, Mithu Mukherjee in lead roles and directed by Basu Chatterjee. The movie is a remake of 1975 Bengali movie Chhutir Phandey.

Cast
 Ashok Kumar as Baldev Raj Gulati 
 Vinod Mehra as Vinod Thakur
 Mithu Mukherjee as Anita Thakur / Vinodini Gulati "Veenu"
 Deven Verma as Sulaiman 
 Pradeep Kumar as R. S. Prakash (Special Appearance)
 Amol Palekar as Amol Palekar / Ramu (Special Appearance)
 Vidya Sinha as Kamla Gulati (Special Appearance)

Songs
The music of the film was composed by Shyamal Mitra and lyrics by Yogesh.

References

External links
 
 

1977 films
Films scored by Shyamal Mitra
1970s Hindi-language films